William George Punch (13 June 1885 – 7 January 1948) was an Australian rules footballer who played with Collingwood in the Victorian Football League (VFL).

Notes

External links 

Bill Punch's profile at Collingwood Forever

1885 births
1948 deaths
Australian rules footballers from Melbourne
Collingwood Football Club players
People from Collingwood, Victoria